Anthropomancy (from Greek anthropos (ἄνθρωπος, man) and manteia (μαντεία, divination)) is a method of divination by the entrails of dead or dying men or women through sacrifice. This practice was sometimes also called splanchnomancy. In ancient Etruria and Rome, the usual variety of divination from entrails was haruspicy (performed by a haruspex), in which the sacrifice was an animal.

Practitioners in fiction
"Clyde Bruckman's Final Repose", an episode of The X-Files
Nasus, the Curator of the Sands, League of Legends
Darken Rahl
Creatures of Light and Darkness
Ninth House

References

Divination